Joseph Michael Yobo (born 6 September 1980) is a Nigerian former professional footballer who played as a centre back. He was the captain of the Nigerian national team until his international football retirement in June 2014, and was Nigeria's record appearance holder. In February 2020, he was appointed assistant coach of the Super Eagles by the Nigeria Football Federation.

Early years
Yobo's birthplace and origin is Kono, an Ogoni community in Khana Local Government Area of Rivers State, Nigeria.

Yobo left Nigeria to join Standard Liège in 1998. He made his first team debut in 2000, and went on to appear 46 times. In 2001, he was bought by Marseille.

Club career

Everton

Soon after making his debut, Yobo was loaned to Tenerife. After around nine months, Yobo returned to Marseille, before joining Everton, again on loan, in July 2002. A £1 million fee was required to register the player, and he became the first signing of David Moyes. An option to make the move permanent was taken up and completed in 2003 after a dispute between Yobo and Marseille was settled, with Everton agreeing a fixed additional fee of £4 million.

Yobo became one of the most consistent players in the Everton squad, and was one of only seven players in the entire league to play every minute of every game throughout the 2006–07 season; his teammate Joleon Lescott also being an ever-present throughout the season.

The delay, in 2006, in signing a new contract with Everton lead to rumours of a move to Arsenal, but on 22 July, Yobo committed himself to Goodison Park until 2010. On 15 April 2007, Yobo became the record appearance holder for an overseas player at Everton, a record he held until early 2012. For the UEFA Cup match against Larissa of Greece on 25 October 2007, Yobo was named as captain in the absence of Phil Neville and thus became the first African to captain the club. On 6 May 2009, Yobo scored his first goal of the season against West Ham United to seal a 3–1 win.

In the 2009–10 season, Yobo had to adjust to his new defensive partner, Sylvain Distin, after Joleon Lescott left and Phil Jagielka became injured. On 29 November 2009, he scored an own goal in Everton's 2–0 defeat to Liverpool in the Merseyside derby. Distin, Jagielka and John Heitinga were increasingly selected over Yobo, confining him to the bench.

Fenerbahçe
On 31 August 2010, Yobo signed a one-year loan contract with Fenerbahçe. Yobo played in 30 official matches and scored a goal, helping his team win the league title. On 6 September 2011, Fenerbahçe and Everton agreed on another loan deal for €700,000 and Yobo signed a one-year contract worth €2.35 million. On 4 August 2012, he re-signed for Fenerbahçe once again, but this time on a permanent basis on a 3-year contract, after having played for Everton for 10 years. On 17 August Fenerbahçe played against Torku Konyaspor and Yobo scored a goal in this match. Before the 2014–2015 season his contract with Fenerbahçe was terminated with mutual agreement. On 31 August 2014 was awarded with the plaque of appreciation and have been released from Fenerbahçe.

Norwich City
On 30 January 2014, Yobo returned to England on loan at Norwich City for the remainder of the season with a view to a permanent move in the summer.

He marked his debut for the club with a clean sheet against top-scoring club Manchester City on 8 February.

International career
Yobo is a former Nigeria international, who has been capped 101 times and represented the Super Eagles at three FIFA World Cups and six Africa Cup of Nations tournaments.

After participating in Nigeria's run to the 1999 FIFA World Youth Championship quarter-finals, Yobo made his senior international debut against Zambia in a 2002 FIFA World Cup qualifier on 24 March 2001. He played in all six of the team's matches in the 2002 Africa Cup of Nations and was included in the squad for the 2002 FIFA World Cup, where he was again ever-present, assisting Julius Aghahowa's goal in a 2–1 loss to Sweden.

Yobo made his second World Cup appearance at the 2010 tournament in South Africa, after which he assumed the captaincy on the international retirement of Nwankwo Kanu. The veteran defender was no longer a first choice player at the 2013 Africa Cup of Nations, but lifted the trophy after appearing as an 89th-minute substitute in Nigeria's 1–0 final defeat of Burkina Faso.

In June 2014, Yobo was included in Stephen Keshi's squad for the 2014 FIFA World Cup. He was named in the starting line-up for both the second and third group matches, helping the Super Eagles to clean sheet in a 1–0 victory over Bosnia and Herzegovina. On 30 June, he made his 100th international appearance, captaining Nigeria against France in the round of 16. After scoring an own goal in the 2–0 defeat, Yobo announced his international retirement, saying: "This is it. I can look back on my career with great pride. I wanted to leave on a high for my country. Defeat by France was not the right way to go but I'm happy with all I've done for the national team. It's time to give a chance to other people to come through."

Coaching career
On 12 February 2020, Yobo was appointed assistant coach of the Super Eagles by the Nigeria Football Federation after a brief meeting held in Abuja. He was appointed assistant coach to replace Imama Amapakabo.

Yobo said "I am bringing back that motivation. As a former captain, I'm bringing inspiration. I've been there and I've done it all. I was a fan of the team before I became an assistant coach, so I've seen from a fanatical point of view how people feel when they are watching the team. We as players, while playing, don't notice these things but after my retirement, I've been a pundit, I've given my opinion about what should be done in the team." He also said "I'm bringing back my experience. Having over 15 years of consistency in my career, I think this is a lot. The good thing is that the spirit is going to improve. Having been a pundit and looking at the team, I think we can go a lot higher with the quality we have".

Personal life
In 2010, following a brief courtship, Yobo married former MBGN Adaeze Igwe in a midnight ceremony held in Jos. The couple wedded in a very low key ceremony barely three months after they met in December 2009. However, it is known that they are said to be trying to hide their marital troubles from the press and general public. The couple welcomed a baby boy named Joey Yobo April 2010.

He is the younger brother of former Nigeria international Albert Yobo. In July 2008, his younger brother Norum was kidnapped in Port Harcourt, Rivers State, Nigeria and held for ransom. He was eventually released after 12 days on 17 July 2008.

It was widely reported in the Nigerian media that Yobo went to T.B. Joshua for prayers after suffering a hamstring injury in the 2010 Africa Cup of Nations. Yobo and his wife, Adaeze Igwe were conferred with chieftaincy titles of Mene Aborlo 1 and Waamene Aborlo 1 respectively of Ogoniland by King GNK Gininwa of Ogoni Kingdom on Saturday, 28 May 2016. This was a day after his testimonial match marking his exit from active football was organised by the Rivers State Government on Friday, 27 May 2016

Charity work
In 2007, Yobo set up the Joseph Yobo Charity Foundation, to help under-privileged children in Nigeria. As of 18 July 2007, he has handed out over 300 scholarship awards ranging from primary to university level. Yobo has started a football academy in the Ogoni region of Nigeria. He also runs football camps in Lagos.

Career statistics

Club

International

Honours
Fenerbahce
Süper Lig: 2010–11
Turkish Cup: 2011–12, 2012–13

Nigeria
Africa Cup of Nations: 2013

Individual
CAF Team of the Year: 2008

See also

 List of men's footballers with 100 or more international caps

References

External links

 
 BBC Coverage of Joseph Yobo Foundation
 International appearances
 
 
 

1980 births
Living people
Nigerian footballers
Nigeria international footballers
Nigeria under-20 international footballers
Nigerian expatriate footballers
Expatriate footballers in England
Expatriate footballers in France
Expatriate footballers in Spain
Expatriate footballers in Belgium
Expatriate footballers in Turkey
Association football central defenders
Standard Liège players
Olympique de Marseille players
Everton F.C. players
Fenerbahçe S.K. footballers
Norwich City F.C. players
Ligue 1 players
Premier League players
Belgian Pro League players
Süper Lig players
2002 FIFA World Cup players
2002 African Cup of Nations players
2004 African Cup of Nations players
2006 Africa Cup of Nations players
2008 Africa Cup of Nations players
2010 Africa Cup of Nations players
2010 FIFA World Cup players
2013 Africa Cup of Nations players
2014 FIFA World Cup players
FIFA Century Club
Nigerian expatriate sportspeople in Turkey
Nigerian expatriate sportspeople in England
Nigerian expatriate sportspeople in France
Nigerian expatriate sportspeople in Spain
Nigerian expatriate sportspeople in Belgium
Sportspeople from Port Harcourt
People from Diobu, Port Harcourt
Africa Cup of Nations-winning players
People from Khana
FA Cup Final players